Flowers is the ninth studio album released by the English rock band Echo & the Bunnymen in May 2001. It reached number 56 on the UK Albums Chart. The album was recorded at the Elevator Studios in Liverpool and the Bryn Derwyn Studios in Wales and produced by Ian McCulloch and Will Sergeant, with additional production by Pete Coleman. Flowers included the singles "It's Alright" and "Make Me Shine". The cover art is from a book by Michael Lesy called Wisconsin Death Trip (1973). It is about a town in Wisconsin called Black River Falls during the Victorian era.

Track listing
All tracks written by Ian McCulloch and Will Sergeant.

"King of Kings" – 4:24
"SuperMellowMan" – 4:58
"Hide & Seek" – 4:07
"Make Me Shine" – 3:54
"It's Alright" – 3:32
"Buried Alive" – 3:55
"Flowers" – 4:16
"Everybody Knows" – 4:40
"Life Goes On" – 3:59
"An Eternity Turns" – 4:03
"Burn for Me" – 3:41

Personnel

Musicians
Ian McCulloch – vocals, guitar, piano
Will Sergeant – lead guitar, tambourine
Alex Germains – bass, backing vocals
Ceri James – keyboards
Vincent Jamieson – drums, congas, tambourine, shakers

Production
Ian McCulloch – producer
Will Sergeant – producer
Pete Coleman – additional production, engineer, mixing
Mike Hunter – additional engineering
David Blackman – mastered by
Stu Reed – pro-tools
Andrew Swainson – design, photography

References

2001 albums
Echo & the Bunnymen albums
Cooking Vinyl albums
Albums recorded at Elevator Studios